Elections to Newry and Mourne District Council were held on 30 May 1973 on the same day as the other Northern Irish local government elections. The election used six district electoral areas to elect a total of 30 councillors.

Election results

Districts summary

|- class="unsortable" align="centre"
!rowspan=2 align="left"|Ward
! % 
!Cllrs
! % 
!Cllrs
! %
!Cllrs
! %
!Cllrs
! %
!Cllrs
!rowspan=2|TotalCllrs
|- class="unsortable" align="center"
!colspan=2 bgcolor="" | SDLP
!colspan=2 bgcolor="" | Alliance
!colspan=2 bgcolor="" | UUP
!colspan=2 bgcolor="" | RC
!colspan=2 bgcolor="white"| Others
|-
|align="left"|Area A
|17.8
|1
|4.3
|0
|bgcolor="40BFF5"|52.7
|bgcolor="40BFF5"|3
|0.0
|0
|25.2
|1
|5
|-
|align="left"|Area B
|bgcolor="#99FF66"|37.9
|bgcolor="#99FF66"|2
|19.8
|1
|13.0
|0
|12.8
|0
|29.3
|1
|4
|-
|align="left"|Area C
|bgcolor="#99FF66"|40.3
|bgcolor="#99FF66"|2
|0.0
|0
|6.4
|0
|7.0
|0
|46.3
|2
|4
|-
|align="left"|Area D
|bgcolor="#99FF66"|38.4
|bgcolor="#99FF66"|3
|10.9
|1
|0.0
|0
|15.7
|1
|35.0
|2
|7
|-
|align="left"|Area E
|bgcolor="#99FF66"|46.3
|bgcolor="#99FF66"|3
|5.3
|0
|0.0
|0
|16.1
|1
|32.3
|2
|6
|-
|align="left"|Area F
|37.8
|2
|bgcolor="#F6CB2F"|42.1
|bgcolor="#F6CB2F"|2
|0.0
|0
|16.1
|0
|4.0
|0
|6
|- class="unsortable" class="sortbottom" style="background:#C9C9C9"
|align="left"| Total
|35.3
|13
|13.5
|4
|12.9
|3
|10.8
|2
|27.5
|8
|30
|-
|}

Districts results

Area A

1973: 3 x UUP, 2 x SDLP, 1 x Independent Nationalist

Area B

1973: 2 x SDLP, 1 x Alliance, 1 x Independent Nationalist

Area C

1973: 2 x SDLP, 2 x Independent Unionist

Area D

1973: 3 x SDLP, 2 x Independent Unionist, 1 x Alliance, 1 x Republican Clubs

Area E

1973: 3 x SDLP, 1 x Republican Clubs, 1 x Independent Unionist, 1 x Independent Republican

Area F

1973: 2 x Alliance, 2 x SDLP

References

Newry and Mourne District Council elections
Newry and Mourne